Bangles is a 2013 Indian Malayalam-language thriller film written by Shyam Menon and directed by debutant Dr. Suvid Wilson who also composed the songs, starring Ajmal Ameer, Poonam Kaur and Archana Kavi.
The film was produced by Dipti B Unni under the banner of Citadel Cinemas. The cinematography was handled by Dileep Raman and editing by Don Max.

The film is about a murderer, who leaves a few pieces of bangles at the crime spot. It was released on 18 October.

Cast
 Ajmal Ameer as Vivek, a cinematographer
 Poonam Kaur as Avanthika
 Archana Kavi as Angel
 Aparna Bajpai as Special Appearance
 Thilakan as Prof. Vincent Chenna Durai
 Thalaivasal Vijay as D.Y.S.P Solomon
 Joy Mathew as priest

References

External links
 

2013 films
Films set in Goa
2010s Malayalam-language films